Puka Qallpa (Quechua puka red, qallpa terrain after the harvest, also spelled Puca Khallpa) is a  mountain in the Bolivian Andes. It is located in the Cochabamba Department, Mizque Province, Alalay Municipality. It lies in the northwest of Kachi Q'asa and northeast of Inka Pirqa. The Puka Urqu Mayu ("red mountain river") flows along its western slope. Its waters flow to the Jatun Mayu ("big river") in the south.

References 

Mountains of Cochabamba Department